John O'Brien (born 12 October 1985) is a current Gaelic player for Louth and Seán O'Mahony's.

Inter-county
O'Brien made his senior debut in 2006 in the O'Byrne Cup against DIT and has been a permanent member of the Wee County since then. He is probably the best Right half backs for Louth and was part of the team who almost won the county's first Leinster title in over 53 years but was snatched controversially by neighbours Meath after ref Martin Sludden awarded a goal which proved to be a square ball and was thrown over the line.
In early 2011 O'Brien announced his plans to emigrate to Australia in search for work alongside his team mates Michael Fanning and midfielder Brian White.

References

External links
 https://archive.today/20130124062512/http://www.gaainfo.com/players/football/louth/John%20O'Brien.php 

1985 births
Living people
Louth inter-county Gaelic footballers